Walter Garwood (30 April 1849 – 10 April 1885) was a New Zealand cricketer. He played two first-class matches for Otago and Wellington between 1873 and 1877.

Garwood was the highest scorer on either side in his first first-class match, scoring 31 in the first innings for Otago against Auckland when no one else in the match reached 20. Garwood was born in England and worked as a miner. He died of tuberculosis at Brisbane Hospital in 1885 aged 36.

References

External links
 

1849 births
1885 deaths
New Zealand cricketers
Otago cricketers
Wellington cricketers
Sportspeople from West Sussex
People from Arun District
Tuberculosis deaths in Australia
19th-century deaths from tuberculosis
Infectious disease deaths in Queensland